Dexpramipexole (KNS-760704) is an orally administered drug candidate shown to selectively and significantly lower eosinophil counts in human blood and tissue. The drug is currently in clinical development for eosinophil-associated diseases by Knopp Biosciences LLC.

In a Phase 2 clinical trial (AS201), dexpramipexole significantly lowered eosinophil counts and improved lung function in subjects with moderate-to-severe eosinophilic asthma. Previous clinical trials showed that dexpramipexole significantly reduced eosinophil counts and glucocorticoid requirements in patients with hypereosinophilic syndrome (HES) and significantly reduced blood and tissue eosinophil counts in patients with chronic rhinosinusitis with nasal polyps. The sponsor is continuing development of dexpramipexole in eosinophilic asthma, HES, and eosinophilic gastrointestinal diseases.

The drug was originally investigated by Knopp Biosciences and Biogen Idec for the treatment of amyotrophic lateral sclerosis (ALS), also known as Lou Gehrig’s disease. A 2010 Phase II clinical trial showed a slowing of ALS disease progression and mortality benefits. In January 2013, Biogen Idec announced it was discontinuing its development of dexpramipexole in ALS due to lack of efficacy in a Phase III study.

Dexpramipexole is the enantiomer of pramipexole. It is a low molecular weight, orally bioavailable, water-soluble small molecule with linear pharmacokinetics. Dexpramipexole was originally identified as a candidate therapy for ALS by James Bennett, M.D., Ph.D., then of the University of Virginia.

See also
 Pramipexole, a dopamine agonist, is the enantiopure (S)-isomer of dexpramipexole. Dexpramipexole has essentially no dopamine agonist activity.

References

External links
STATEMENT ON A NONPROPRIETARY NAME ADOPTED BY THE USAN COUNCIL, contains structural formula and chemical name
Clinicaltrials.gov: Dexpramipexole Dose-Ranging Biomarker Study in Subjects With Eosinophilic Asthma (AS201)
Clinicaltrials.gov:Study to Evaluate Safety and Efficacy of Dexpramipexole (KNS-760704) in Subjects With Hypereosinophilic Syndrome
Clinicaltrials.gov:Study of Dexpramipexole Chronic Sinusitis With Nasal Polyps and Eosinophilia (CS201)

Thiazoles
Enantiopure drugs